In mathematical analysis, Strichartz estimates are a family of inequalities for linear dispersive partial differential equations.  These inequalities establish size and decay of solutions in mixed norm Lebesgue spaces.  They were first noted by Robert Strichartz and arose out of connections to the Fourier restriction problem.

Examples 

In this case the homogeneous Strichartz estimates take the form:
 

The inhomogeneous Strichartz estimates are:

References

Theorems in analysis
Inequalities